Powysia is a genus of moths of the family Crambidae. It contains only one species, Powysia rosealinea, which is found on Kenya and Tanzania.

References

Pyraustinae
Crambidae genera